Café Café (Hebrew: קפה קפה) is a chain of cafés in Israel. In February 2010, Café Café had 112 locations, making it the largest coffee chain in the country at the time, overtaking Aroma Espresso Bar.

History
Café Café was founded in 2001 in Israel. The chain expanded in 2010 to 112 branches, becoming the largest coffee shop chain in Israel.

In 2015, the Tel Aviv Regional Labor Court fined a franchisee of the chain 30,000 NIS for racial discrimination after refusing to hire an Israeli-Arab trainee on the grounds that the cafe was kosher.

In 2016, about 12% of Israelis said that Café Café was their favorite chain. In January 2023, about 65 branches operate, down from about 150.

See also

 List of restaurants in Israel
Economy of Israel
Israeli cuisine

References

External links
Cafecafe.co.il

Food and drink companies of Israel
Restaurant chains in Israel
Restaurants established in 2001
Coffeehouses and cafés in Israel
Israeli companies established in 2001
Restaurants in Tel Aviv
Restaurants in Jerusalem
Restaurants in Haifa